The SNCF Class BB 17000 B-B was a class of AC electric locomotives built between 1965 and 1968. The class was used for suburban duties on railway lines around Paris, notably powering VB2N push-pull sets. They were monophase locomotives (running off 25 kV AC overhead supply) and had the nickname "danseuses" or "dancers". By 2020 the 105-strong class of locomotives had all been withdrawn.

One member of the class had been named, BB 17051 Cormeilles-en-Parisis.

Service
After spending a varied first part of their careers hauling different types of train, the locomotives were regrouped for use on the Parisian "trains de la banlieue" or suburban trains. They were all owned and operated by Transilien.

References

17000
B-B locomotives
Alstom locomotives
Standard gauge electric locomotives of France
Railway locomotives introduced in 1965

Passenger locomotives